The NYSE Listed Company Manual is a set of regulations applicable to all corporations who wish to sell securities by listing themselves on the New York Stock Exchange. The Manual covers regulations on how a corporation's board should be composed, its internal audit and remuneration committees function, the voting rights of stockholders, standards for disclosure when issuing shares, and so forth.

See also
 US corporate law
 UK company law
 London Stock Exchange
 Listing Rules

External links
 NYSE Listed Company Manual online

New York Stock Exchange
United States corporate law